The A-class was a class of 20 trams built by Duncan & Fraser, Adelaide for the Prahran & Malvern Tramways Trust (PMTT). All passed to the Melbourne & Metropolitan Tramways Board on 2 February 1920 when it took over the PMTT becoming the A-class retaining their running numbers.

Fourteen were transferred to the isolated Footscray network in 1923/24. Three were converted to non-passenger use in 1925-27. The others were withdrawn in 1928-31.

References

Melbourne tram vehicles